This is a list of gliders/sailplanes of the world, (this reference lists all gliders with references, where available) 
Note: Any aircraft can glide for a short time, but gliders are designed to glide for longer.

Ukrainian miscellaneous constructors

 Aerola AL-12
 Aerola AL-12M
 Aerola Alatus
 Aerola Alatus-M

Notes

Further reading

External links

Lists of glider aircraft